José Reyna (born 19 January 1972) is a Peruvian footballer. He played in seven matches for the Peru national football team from 1996 to 1997. He was also part of Peru's squad for the 1997 Copa América tournament.

References

External links
 

1972 births
Living people
Peruvian footballers
Peru international footballers
Place of birth missing (living people)
Association football defenders